Bruno Rahmen (born 15 October 1948) is a former Swiss football player and manager.

Private life 
After his football career, Rahmen worked for the Basler chemical industry and advanced to Sales Executive before his retirement. He married Marlis in 1966 and they have two sons Patrick and Micha, both of whom also became professional footballers. From July 2007 until October 2011, Patrick Rahmen was trainer and manager of the FC Basel U-21 squad, presently he is assistant to Thorsten Fink at Hamburger SV in the Bundesliga.

Football career 
Rahmen started his football with the youth teams of FC Riehen and also played in their amateur 2. Liga first team. In 1966, he signed for FC Basel and played with them for ten years, winning the Swiss League Championship five times, the Swiss Cup twice and the Swiss League Cup once.

In the summer of 1976, Rahmen transferred to FC Luzern (then in the second division) and played for them for five years, winning promotion with his team in the 1978/79 season. Bruno Rahmen finished his playing career as player-manager by BSC Old Boys in the top Swiss Amateur League.

During the 1983–1985 period, Rahmen was manager of FC Luzern. In 1992, he was also caretaker manager of Basel for a short time, together with Karl Odermatt, after Ernst August Künnecke was sacked and before Friedel Rausch took over.

Honours 
Basel
 Swiss League: 1967, 1969, 1970, 1972, 1973
 Swiss Cup: 1967, 1975
 Swiss League Cup: 1973
 Coppa delle Alpi: 1969, 1970

Luzern
 Promotion to Swiss Super League: 1979

References 

1948 births
Living people
Swiss men's footballers
Swiss football managers
FC Basel players
FC Luzern players
FC Luzern managers
FC Basel managers
Association football defenders 
Association football midfielders